2014 in professional wrestling describes the year's events in the world of professional wrestling.

List of notable promotions 
These promotions held notable shows in 2014.

Calendar of notable shows

January

February

March

April

May

June

July

August

September

October

November

December

Notable events
February 24 – WWE launched the WWE Network in the United States, an over-the-top streaming service and digital television network, hosting thousands of hours of in-ring shows and all pay-per-views (PPV) from WWE and various promotions they have acquired over the years, such as Extreme Championship Wrestling and World Championship Wrestling, as well as airing current WWE PPVs, NXT events, and other original productions. It had a staggered launch throughout the rest of the world.
December 1 – New Japan Pro-Wrestling (NJPW) launched NJPW World, a worldwide streaming site for the promotion's events, including airing current events live as well as hosting events from the promotion's archives, dating back to 1972.

Accomplishments and tournaments

AAA

Total Nonstop Action Wrestling

WWE

Title changes

AAA

NJPW

ROH

The Crash Lucha Libre

TNA

WWE

NXT

Awards and honors

AAA Hall of Fame

Pro Wrestling Illustrated

TNA Hall of Fame

Wrestling Observer Newsletter

Wrestling Observer Newsletter Hall of Fame

Wrestling Observer Newsletter awards

WWE

WWE Hall of Fame

Slammy Awards

Debuts

Uncertain debut date
Lacey Evans
 January 1 - Dragon Lee (wrestler)
 January 12 – Yuna Manase
 January 28 – Rika Tatsumi
 April 12 - Carmelo Hayes
 April 29 – Shunma Katsumata
 May 17 – Tom Lawlor 
 May 31 – Chelsea Green/Laurel Van Ness
 June 13 – Tessa Blanchard
 August 6 
 Kota Sekifuda
 Toshiyuki Sakuda
 September 5 – Chad Gable
 September 18 – Dana Brooke
 October 3 – Velveteen Dream
 October 18 
 Kota Umeda
 Kouki Iwasaki
 October 29 – Hiroe Nagahama
 November 24 – Michiko Miyagi
 November 28 – Dai Suzuki
 November 29 
 Kazusada Higuchi
 Ryota Nakatsu
 December 19 – Braun Strowman

Retirements

 Kaitlyn (August 29, 2010 – January 8, 2014) (first retirement, returned in 2018 on Mae Young Classic)
 Jillian Hall (1998 – January 21, 2014)
 Bonnie Maxon (2000 – January 24, 2014)
 CM Punk (1999–January 2014; returned in 2021)
 Kensuke Sasaki (February 16, 1986 – February 13, 2014)
 El Dandy (1981–2014)
 Axl Rotten (1987–2014)
 Chuck Palumbo (1998–2014)
 Sgt. Slaughter (1972-March 29, 2014) 
 Beulah McGillicutty (1995–2014)
 Christian Cage (1995–2014) (first retirement, returned to WWE in June 2020) 
 Drake Wuertz (August 31, 2001 – April 27, 2014)
 Sarah Bäckman (2012–2014)
 Jose Gonzalez (1966-2014) 
 Adrian Street (1957 – June 14, 2014) 
 Natsuki Taiyo (January 3, 2004 –	June 1, 2014)
 Batista (October 30, 1999 – June 2, 2014) (first retirement, briefly returned in 2019)
 Aksana (September 2009 – June 10, 2014)
 Vickie Guerrero (July 14, 2005 – June 23, 2014)
 Petey Williams (January 23, 2002 – July 5, 2014)
 Santino Marella (August 17, 2003 – July 6, 2014)
 Matt Bloom (1997 – August 7, 2014) (moved to a trainer)
 Shinya Ishikawa (March 11, 2008 – August 13, 2014)
 Sachie Abe (1996 – August 14, 2014)
 Ronnie Garvin (1962-September 20, 2014) 
 El Sicodélico (1968-November 16, 2014) 
 Barry Buchanan (1995 – November 22, 2014)
 Corey Graves (March 22, 2000 – December 11, 2014) (moved to color commentator)
 Adam Pearce (May 16, 1996 – December 21, 2014)
 Miho Wakizawa (July 28, 1996 – December 23, 2014)

Deaths

 January 6 – Don Chuy, 72 
 January 14 – Mae Young, 90
 January 20 – George Scott, 84
 February 18 – Viscera, 43
 March 5 – Billy Robinson, 75
 March 15 – Lorenzo Parente, 78 
 March 17 – Al Oeming, 88
 April 8 – The Ultimate Warrior, 54
 April 25 – Connor Michalek, 8
 April 27 – Lee Marshall, 64
 May 11 - Mark Frear, 44
 July 2 or 3 - Dave Legeno, 50
 August 6 – Ken Lucas, 72
 August 21 – Maximum Capacity, 46
 September 8 – Sean O'Haire, 43
 September 23 – Don Manoukian, 80
 October 12 – Cowboy Bob Kelly, 78
 October 20 – Ox Baker, 80
 October 21 – Johnny Lee Clary, 55
 October 28 – Koichiro Kimura, 44
 October 30 – Bob Geigel, 90 
 December 6 – Jimmy Del Ray, 52

See also
List of NJPW pay-per-view events
List of ROH pay-per-view events
List of TNA pay-per-view events
List of WWE Network events
List of WWE pay-per-view events

References

 
professional wrestling